The Cambridgeshire Invitation Cup is the senior county cup competition of the Cambridgeshire County Football Association. Established in 1950, it is contested by amateur and semi-professional football clubs in and around the English county of Cambridgeshire as well as reserve teams of clubs such as Cambridge United and Histon. The first winners were Cambridge City and the current holders are Ely City.

List of Winners

List of finals

References

County Cup competitions
Football in Cambridgeshire
1950 establishments in England